London Buses route 111 is a Transport for London contracted bus route in London, England. Running between Heathrow Airport and Kingston, it is operated by Abellio London.

History

Route 111 commenced operating on 16 February 1944 from Hounslow garage to Hanworth. It was converted to driver-only single-deck operation with AEC Swifts on 23 August 1969. At the same time a self-service system was introduced on routes 110 and 111, with passengers buying tickets from a machine. It was extended to Heathrow Airport in 1981.

From 1 December 2007, route 111 was converted into a 24-hour service; before its introduction a number of residents in Hampton complained to the local newspaper and Transport for London, who named the alternative of more route 481 buses bypassing Hampton to the north-east. Supporters of the extension in hours of operation included the Royal Borough of Kingston upon Thames.

Weekday peak hours service increased to every 8–9 minutes in 2010. The service was free within the Heathrow free travel zone, until the travel zone was abolished in June 2021 after Heathrow Airport Holdings withdrew funding.

Having been operated out of Hounslow garage since its inception, on 30 April 2022 it was taken over by Abellio London and began being operated out of Twickenham bus garage. The route is temporarily using New Routemasters prior to the arrival of 30 new Wright StreetDeck Electroliner battery electric buses, which began to be delivered in January 2023.

Current route
Route 111 operates via these primary locations:
Heathrow Central bus station    
Harlington Corner
Cranford
Heston
Lampton Corner
Hounslow East station 
Hounslow bus station 
Hanworth
Hampton School
Hampton station 
Hampton Thames Street
Hampton Court Palace 
Kingston Wood Street
Cromwell Road bus station  for Kingston station

References

External links

Bus routes in London
Buses serving Heathrow Airport
Transport in the London Borough of Hillingdon
Transport in the London Borough of Hounslow
Transport in the Royal Borough of Kingston upon Thames
Transport in the London Borough of Richmond upon Thames